R v District Auditor No 3 Audit District of West Yorkshire MCC, ex parte West Yorkshire MCC [1986] RVR 24 is an English trusts law case, concerning the certainty of trusts, and their administrative workability.

Facts
West Yorkshire Metropolitan County Council wished to create a discretionary trust of £400,000 to be applied for a list of purposes ‘for the benefit of any or all or some of the inhabitants of the county of West Yorkshire.'

Judgment
Taylor J held that the trust was invalid, because it was administratively unworkable to distribute such small amounts to all people. The trust was not, however, ‘capricious’, but merely too difficult and costly for a court to enforce.

See also

English trusts law

Notes

References

English trusts case law
1986 in England
1986 in case law
1980s in West Yorkshire
High Court of Justice cases
1986 in British law